The Danville Micropolitan Statistical Area is a Micropolitan Statistical Area (μSA) in Virginia as defined by the United States Office of Management and Budget (OMB).  As of the 2010 census, the μSA had a population of 106,561

The Danville μSA was previously classified as a Metropolitan Statistical Area (MSA) until 2013, when it was demoted to a Micropolitan Statistical Area due to core urban area's population falling below 50,000.

μSA components
Note: Since a state constitutional change in 1871, all cities in Virginia are independent cities that are not located in any county. The OMB considers these independent cities to be county-equivalents for the purpose of defining MSAs and μSAs in Virginia.

One county and one independent city are included in the Danville Micropolitan Statistical Area.

Counties
Pittsylvania
Independent Cities
Danville

Communities

Incorporated places
Chatham
Danville (Principal city)
Gretna
Hurt

Unincorporated places
Blairs
Chalk Level
Dry Fork
Grit
Mount Airy
Mt. Hermon
Pickeral's Crossing
Pittsville
Renan
Ringgold
Sonans
Straightstone
Whittles Depot
Tightsqueeze

Demographics
As of the census of 2000, there were 110,156 people, 45,291 households, and 31,157 families residing within the MSA. The racial makeup of the MSA was 65.71% White, 32.64% African American, 0.15% Native American, 0.37% Asian, 0.02% Pacific Islander, 0.41% from other races, and 0.70% from two or more races. Hispanic or Latino of any race were 1.24% of the population.

The median income for a household in the μSA was $31,027, and the median income for a family was $38,600. Males had a median income of $29,863 versus $21,383 for females. The per capita income for the μSA was $17,071.

See also
List of U.S. Micropolitan Statistical Areas in Virginia
Virginia census statistical areas

References

 
Pittsylvania County, Virginia
Danville, Virginia